Maple Grove Hospital is a short term acute care hospital located in Maple Grove, Minnesota. It is one of two emergency care facilities in Maple Grove. The other facility is Park Nicollet Urgent Care.

History
The hospital took some time to get approved because of controversy and the need for legislative approval.  However, it was approved to be built by 2006.  It opened in 2009.

On December 31, 2019, the hospital celebrated its 10 year anniversary.

The owners of the hospital, North Memorial Health, as of September 2021, are planning to expand the hospital.

References

Hospital buildings completed in 2010
Hospitals established in 2009
Hospitals in Minnesota
Maple Grove, Minnesota
Non-profit organizations based in Minnesota
Buildings and structures in Hennepin County, Minnesota